is a Japanese film director.

Career
Born in Aichi Prefecture, Yamashita attended Osaka University of Arts where he worked on Kazuyoshi Kumakiri's Kichiku Dai Enkai. His graduation film Hazy Life, took the Off Theatre Competition Grand Prize at the 2000 Yubari International Fantastic Film Festival. He also won the award for Best Director at the 32nd Hochi Film Award in 2007 for A Gentle Breeze in the Village and The Matsugane Potshot Affair. He often works with the screenwriter Kōsuke Mukai.

Filmography

Film
  (1999)
  (2003)
  (2003)
  (2004)
 Linda Linda Linda  (2005)
  (2006) ominbus
 The Matsugane Potshot Affair (2006)
 A Gentle Breeze in the Village (2007)
 My Back Page (2011)
 The Drudgery Train (2012)
 Tamako in Moratorium (2013)
 La La La at Rock Bottom (2015)
 Over the Fence (2016)
  (2016)
  (2018)
 Let's Go Karaoke! (2023)
 My Missing Valentine (2023)

TV
Midnight Diner (2009–2006)
 Modern Love Tokyo (2022, episode 3)

References

External links
 
 
 Fukugan no eizō - Conversation between Yamashita and Mukai, Directors Guild of Japan website (in Japanese)

1976 births
Living people
Japanese film directors
People from Aichi Prefecture
Osaka University of Arts alumni